Khandela Assembly constituency is one of constituencies of Rajasthan Legislative Assembly in the Sikar (Lok Sabha constituency).

Khandela Constituency covers all voters from parts of Srimadhopur tehsil, which includes ILRC Khandela including Khandela Municipal Board, ILRC Jajod, ILRC Kanwat, ILRC Reengus including Reengus Municipal Board, and Bassi, Nimera and Ralawata of ILRC Srimadhopur.

See also 
 Member of the Legislative Assembly (India)

References

Sikar district
Assembly constituencies of Rajasthan